Fables for Our Time and Famous Poems Illustrated is a 1940 book by James Thurber. Thurber updates some old fables and creates some new ones of his own. Notably there is 'The Bear Who Could Take It Or Leave It Alone' about a bear who lapses into alcoholism before sobering up and going too far that way. (He used to say 'See what the bears in the back room will have.') Also an updated version of 'Little Red Riding Hood' which ends with the immortal lines, "even in a nightcap a wolf does not look any more like your grandmother than the Metro-Goldwyn lion looks like Calvin Coolidge. So the little girl took an automatic out of her basket and shot the wolf dead. " All the fables have one-line morals. The moral of 'Little Red Riding Hood' is "Young girls are not so easy to fool these days." Another fable concerns a non-materialist chipmunk who likes to arrange nuts in pretty patterns rather than just piling up as many as he can. He is constantly nagged by his chipmunk wife for this.

All fables had previously appeared in The New Yorker.

Contents

Fables 
Fables for Our Time and Famous Poems Illustrated
contains 28 fables written and illustrated by Thurber.

Illustrated Poems 
Fables for Our Time and Famous Poems Illustrated contains nine poems written by diverse authors and illustrated by Thurber (the dates given are those of The New Yorker issue):
 Excelsior, written by Henry Wadsworth Longfellow, March 11, 1939
 The Sands o' Dee, written by Charles Kingsley
 Lochinvar, written by Sir Walter Scott, April  8, 1939
 Locksley Hall, written by Alfred Tennyson
 "Oh When I Was ...", written by A. E. Housman
 Curfew Must Not Ring To-Night, written by Rose Hartwick Thorpe, June 17, 1939
 Barbara Frietchie, written by John Greenleaf Whittier, September 16, 1939
 The Glove and the Lions, written by Leigh Hunt
 Ben Bolt, written by Thomas Dunn English

1940 anthologies
1940 poetry books
1940 short story collections
Fables
Works by James Thurber